Cydosia aurivitta, the gold-banded cydosia or straight-lined cydosia, is an owlet moth (family Noctuidae). The species was first described by Augustus Radcliffe Grote and Coleman Townsend Robinson in 1868. It is found in North America.

The MONA or Hodges number for Cydosia aurivitta is 8999.

References

Further reading

External links
 

Noctuidae
Articles created by Qbugbot
Moths described in 1868